Hoseynabad-e Kamal al Malek (also Romanized as Ḩoseynābād-e Kamāl āl Maleḵ; also known as Ḩoseynābād-e Kamāl) is a village in Takht-e Jolgeh Rural District, in the Central District of Firuzeh County, Razavi Khorasan Province, Iran. At the 2006 census, its population was 53, in 10 families.

References 

Populated places in Firuzeh County